The Australian Institute of Architects (officially as the Royal Australian Institute of Architects, abbreviated as RAIA) is the professional body for architects in Australia. The post-nominals of FRAIA (Fellow) and RAIA (Members and organisation abbreviation) continue to be used.  The Institute supports 14,000 members across Australia, including 550 Australian members who are based in architectural roles across 40 countries outside Australia. SONA (Student Organised Network for Architecture) is the national student-membership body of the Australian Institute of Architects.

History 
The Australian Institute of Architects was established on 6 September 1929 and continued under this name until 18 August 1930, when the "Royal" title was granted, and it became the Royal Australian Institute of Architects.

A number of states formed professional societies for architects, including the Queensland Institute of Architects, and the West Australian Institute of Architects.

The South Australian Institute of Architects (SAIA) was founded by a resolution passed by a group of architects on 20 September 1886, and in 1904 Walter Hervey Bagot designed its seal. David Williams was one of the founding group, and was president from 1911 to 1913. During this time he called on the South Australian Government to hold design competitions for large public buildings, and the SAIA also became an allied member of the Royal Institute of British Architects.

The Australian Institute was formed in 1929, when state architectural institutes combined to form a unified national association, although full federation of the state-based institutes did not come about immediately, with some states maintaining their independence. The South Australian Institute of Architects only joined up in July 1962, becoming the "South Australian Chapter". The Royal Victorian Institute of Architects (RVIA) was the last to join, in 1968.

Name change
In August 2008, following an informal poll of members in 2001, the National Council resolved to continue trading as the "Australian Institute of Architects", while retaining "Royal Australian Institute of Architects" as the legal name. The postnominals of "FRAIA" (Fellow) and "RAIA" (Members and organisation abbreviation) continue to be used with the legal name abbreviated.

Purpose, functions, affiliations
As a professional body representing architects, the institute is represented on many national and state industry and government bodies, and is affiliated with the International Union of Architects (UIA).

A chapter is maintained in each state and territory,

National awards and prizes

Gold Medal

The AIA Gold Medal is the highest award of the Australian Institute of Architects awarded annually since 1960.

Paula Whitman Leadership in Gender Equity Prize 
This award honours architect and gender equity advocate Paula Whitman.

Parlour: Gender, Equity, Architecture (2020)
Helen Lochhead (2019)
 Melonie Bayl-Smith (2018)
 Catherine Baudet (2017)

National Architecture Awards
The National Architecture Awards have been presented since 1981 and include:
 The Sir Zelman Cowen Award for Public Architecture
 The Robin Boyd Award for Residential Architecture – Houses
 The Frederick Romberg Award for Residential Architecture – Multiple Housing
 The Harry Seidler Award for Commercial Architecture
 The Lachlan Macquarie Award for Heritage
 The Emil Sodersten Award for Interior Architecture
 The Walter Burley Griffin Award for Urban Design
 The Nicholas Murcutt Award for Small Project Architecture
 The David Oppenheim Award for Sustainable Architecture
 The Jørn Utzon Award for International Architecture
 Colorbond Award for Steel Architecture

State architecture awards and prizes
Each of the state chapters also presents awards, with notable examples including:

New South Wales

 Sir John Sulman Medal for Public Architecture
 Lloyd Rees Award for Urban Design
 Sir Arthur G Stephenson Award for Commercial Architecture
 John Verge Award for Interior Architecture
 Milo Dunphy Award for Sustainable Architecture
 Wilkinson Award for Residential Architecture – Houses (New)
 Hugh and Eva Buhrich Award for Residential Architecture – Houses (Alterations and Additions)
 Aaron Bolot Award for Residential Architecture – Multiple Housing
 Robert Woodward Award for Small Project Architecture
 Greenway Award for Heritage
 Marion Mahony Griffin Prize for female architects.

Queensland
 FDG Stanley Award for Public Architecture
 Robin Dods Award for Residential Architecture – Houses (New) 
 Job & Froud Award for Residential Architecture – Multiple Housing
 Beatrice Hutton Award for Commercial Architecture
 Hayes & Scott Award for Small Project Architecture
 G.H.M. Addison Award for Interior Architecture
 Robin Gibson Award for Enduring Architecture 
 Don Roderick Award for Heritage
 Harry Marks Award for Sustainable Architecture
 Karl Langer Award for Urban Design

South Australia
 Sir James Irwin Chapter President's Medal
 Jack McConnell Award for Public Architecture
 Keith Neighbour Award for Commercial Architecture
 Robert Dickson Award for Interior Architecture
 John S Chappell Award for Residential Architecture – Houses (New)
 David Saunders Award for Heritage Architecture (after David Saunders (1928–1986), appointed professor of architecture at the University of Adelaide in 1977, and second president of Australia ICOMOS (International Council on Monuments and Sites) in 1978)
 Derrick Kendrick Award for Sustainable Architecture
 Jack Cheesman Award For Enduring Architecture

Victoria

 Victorian Architecture Medal
 William Wardell Award for Public Architecture
 Public Architecture Award (Alterations and Additions)
 Joseph Reed Award for Urban Design
 Sir Osborn McCutcheon Award for Commercial Architecture
 John George Knight Award for Heritage Architecture
 Harold Desbrowe-Annear Award for Residential Architecture Houses – New
 John and Phyllis Murphy Award for Residential Architecture Houses – Alterations and Additions

Western Australia

 George Temple-Poole Award

Presidents

National presidents
National presidents:

1929–1930 Alfred Samuel Hook
1930–1931 William Arthur Mordey Blackett
1931–1932 Philip Rupert Claridge
1932–1933 Lange Powell
1933–1934 Charles Edward Serpell
1934–1935 Arthur William Anderson
1935–1936 Guy St John Makin
1936–1937 James Nangle
1937–1938 Louis Laybourne Smith
1938–1939 Frederick Bruce Lucas
1939–1940 Otto Albrecht Yuncken
1940–1942 William Ronald Richardson
1942–1944 John Francis Deighton Scarborough
1944–1946 Roy Sharrington Smith
1946–1948 William Rae Laurie
1948–1950 Jack Denyer Cheesman
1950–1952 Cobden Parkes
1952–1954 Robert Snowden Demaine
1954–1956 Edward James Archibald Weller
1956–1957 William Purves Race Godfrey
1957–1959 Wilfred Thomas Haslam
1959–1960 Kenneth Charles Duncan
1960–1961 Thomas Brenan Femister Gargett
1961–1962 Henry Ingham Ashworth
1962–1963 James Campbell Irwin
1963–1964 Max Ernest Collard
1964–1965 Raymond Berg
1965–1966 Gavin Walkley
1966–1967 Mervyn Henry Parry
1967–1968 Best Overend
1968–1969 Jack Hobbs McConnell
1969–1970 John David Fisher
1970–1971 Ronald Andrew Gilling
1978-1979 John Davidson
1992-1993 Robert Denyer Cheesman
1990-1991 Robert Caulfield
1994–1995 Louise Cox

1995–1996 Peter Robert Gargett 
1996–1997 John Stanley Castles
1997–1998 Eric Graham Butt
1998–1999 Graham Humphries 
1999–2000 Nigel Warren Shaw

2000–2001 Edward Robert Haysom 
2001–2003 Graham Jahn 
2003–2004 David John Parken
2004–2005 Warren Merton Kerr
2005–2006 Bob Nation
2006–2007 Carey Lyon
2007–2008 Alec Tzannes
2008–2009 Howard Tanner

2009–2010 Melinda Dodson
2010–2011 Karl Fender
2011–2012 Brian Zulaikha
2012–2013 Shelley Penn
2013–2014 Paul Berkemeier
2014–2015 David Karotkin
2015–2016 Jon Clements
2016–2017 Ken Maher
2017–2018 Richard Kirk
2018–2019 Clare Cousins
2019–2020 Helen Lochhead
2020–2021 Alice Hampson
2021–2022 Tony Giannone
2022-2023 Shannon Battisson
2023-2024 Bill Krotiris

State and territory chapter presidents

Australian Capital Territory (established 1962)
ACT Chapter established in 1962.

1962–1964 Malcolm Moir
1964–1966 John Scollay
1966–1968 Peter Harrison
1968–1970 John Goldsmith
1970–1972 Horrie Holt
1972–1974 Arthur Tow
1974–1976 Neil Renfree
1976–1978 Tony Cooper
1978–1980 Mervyn Willoughby-Thomas
1980–1982 Ian Thompson
1982–1984 Geoffrey Butterworth
1984–1986 Barry Cameron
1986–1988 Rick Butt
1988–1990 Alastair Swayn
1990–1992 Colin Stewart
1992–1993 Peter Freeman
1993–1994 Annabelle Pegrum
1994–1998 Graham Humphries
1998–2002
2002–2006 Catherine Townsend
2006–2008 Melinda Dodson
2008–2010 David Flannery
2010–2012 Sheila Hughes
2012–2014 Tony Trobe
2014–2016 Andrew Wilson
2016–2018 Rob Henry
2018–2020 Philip Leeson
2020–2022 Shannon Battissonn

New South Wales (established 1871, NSW Chapter from 1933)

1871–1878 George Allen Mansfield
1878–1889 Thomas Rowe
1889–1895 John Horbury Hunt
1895–1898 Thomas Rowe
1898–1902 John Barlow
1902–1903 George Allen Mansfield
1903–1905 Cyril Blacket
1906–1908 Harry Kent
1908–1910 Ernest Alfred Scott
1910–1911 George Birrell Robertson
1911–1912 John Francis Hennessy
1912–1914 George Sydney Jones
1914–1916 Arthur William Anderson
1916–1919 Arthur Pritchard
1919–1919 Charles Henry Slatyer
1919–1920 Arthur Pritchard
1920–1921 George Sydney Jones
1921–1922 George Herbert Godsell
1922–1926 Sir Charles Rosenthal
1926–1929 Alfred Samuel Hook
1929–1931 James Peddle
1931–1932 Henry Budden
1932–1933 Ernest Alfred Scott
1933–1934 Leslie Wilkinson
1934–1936 Arthur William Anderson
1936–1938 Leith Cecil McCredie
1938–1940 William Ronald Richardson
1940–1942 Samuel George Thorp
1942–1944 Cobden Parkes
1944–1946 Percy James Gordon
1946–1948 Frank William Turner
1948–1950 Adrian Ashton
1950–1952 Alan Edgecliff Stafford
1952–1954 Eric William Andrew
1954–1956 Geoffrey Lewis Moline
1956–1960 Max Ernest Collard
1960–1962 Albert Henry Alfred Hanson
1962–1964 Cyril John Farrington
1964–1966 Ronald Andrew Gilling
1966–1970 Richard Norman Johnson
1970–1972 Bryce Mortlock
1972–1974 Geoffrey Lumsdaine
1974–1976 J. Fisher
1976–1978 Eric Daniels
1978–1980 Geoffrey Lumsdaine
1980–1982 Martyn David Chapman
1982–1984 Chris Johnson
1984–1986 Kevin Rice
1986–1988 Lawrence Nield
1988–1990 Louise Cox
1990–1992 Richard Dinham
1992–1994 John Richardson
1994–1996 John Bilmon
1996–2000 David Brown
2000–2002 Graham Jahn
2002–2004 Caroline Pidcock
2004–2008 Deborah Dearing
2008–2011 Brian Zulaikha
2011–2013 Matthew Pullinger
2013–2015 Joe Agius
2015–2017 Shaun Carter
2017–2019 Andrew Nimmo
2019– 2021 Kathlyn Loseby
2021–date Laura Cockburn

Northern Territory
President: Rossi Kouronis
Immediate Past President: Jenny Culgan

Queensland
President 2022-2024: Amy Degenhart
Immediate Past President: Mark Jones
President 2020-2022: Michael Lavery

South Australia
President: Anthony Coupe
Immediate Past President: Tony Giannone

Tasmania
President: Stuart Tanner
Immediate Past President: Seamus Mulcahy

Victoria

 Victorian Institute of Architects (VIA), founded, 21 August 1856
 1856-61 John George Knight
 1861-65 John Gill
 1871-74 Joseph Reed
 1874-81 Sir Redmond Barry
 1881-82 George Wharton
 1882-84 Charles Webb
 1884-85 Nathaniel Billing
 1885-86 Thomas Watts
 1886-87 Lloyd Tayler
 1887-88 Alfred Purchas
 1888-89 Sir George Verdon
 1889-90 Lloyd Tayler
 1890-92 George Charles Inskip
 1892-93 Percy Oakden
 1893-95 Arthur Ebden Johnson
 1895-97 Percy Oakden
 1897-99 Anketell Matthew Henderson
 1899-01 Lloyd Tayler
 Royal Victorian Institute of Architects (RVIA), established
 1901-02 Percy Oakden
 1902-03 Thomas Watts
 1903-05 John Augustus Bernhard Koch
 1905-07 Charles D’Ebro
 1907-08 Francis Joseph Smart
 1908-10 Edward Albert Bates
 1910-11 Anketell Matthew Henderson
 1911-13 Gerard Wight
 1913-14 Anketell Matthew Henderson
 1914-16 Henry William Tompkins
 1916-18 William Arthur Mordey Blackett
 1918-19 Arthur Peck
 1919-21 Frank Stapley
 1921-23 Kingsley Anketell Henderson
 1923-24 William Scott Purves Godfrey
 1924-26 Philip Burgoyne Hudson
 1926-28 Percy Allport Oakley
 1928-30 William Arthur Mordey Blackett
 1930-31 Thomas Johnstone Buchan
 1931-33 Leighton Francis Irwin
 1933-35 Charles Edward Serpell
 1935-37 Frederick Louis Klingender
 1937-39 Alec Stanley Eggleston
 1939-41 Leslie Marsh Perrott
 1941-42 Sir Walter Osborn McCutcheon KT
 1942-45 John Francis Deighton Scarborough
 1945-47 Robert Snowden Demaine
 1947-49 William Purves Race Godfrey OBE TD
 1949-51 Eric Keith Mackay OBE
 1951-53 Eric Hughes
 1952-55 William Balcombe Griffiths OBE MC ED
 1955-57 Harry Stephen Winbush
 1957-59 Raymond Berg
 1959-61 Professor Brian Bannatyne Lewis
 1961-63 Acheson Best Overend MBE
 1963-65 David Fisher
 1965-66 Stanley Maurice Charles Evans
 1966 Ronald Grant Lyon AM
 Royal Australian Institute of Architects (RAIA), Victorian Chapter established
 1966-67 Ronald Grant Lyon AM
 1968-69 Lloyd Emerson Albert Orton
 1969-70 Robert Peter McIntyre AO
 1971      Robin Penleigh Boyd CBE
 1972      Reginald Edward Grouse DFC
 1973-74 John David Gates
 1975-76 Neil Clerehan
 1977-78 Richard Melville Young AM
 1978-80 Neil Thomas Edward Montgomery
 1980-82 James Heward Earle AM
 1982-84 John Perrin Alsop
 1984-86 Dimity Alexandria Reed
 1986-88 Charles Justin
 1988-90 William Spiers Corker
 1990-92 Stephen Cameron Ashton
 1992-94 John Stanley Castles
 1994-97 Garry Bruce Marshall
 1997-00 James Crofts Learmonth
 2000-02 Ian Lachlan McDougall
 2002-04 Elisabetta Maria Giannini
 2004-06 Robert Alan Stent
 2006-08 Philip James Goad
 2008-10 Karl Arthur Fender
 2010-12 Robert Paul Puksand
 2012-14 Jonathan William Clements
 2014-16 Peter Francis Malatt
 2016-18 Vanessa Bird
 2018-20 Amy Muir
 2020-22 Bill Krotiris

Western Australia (Established 1896, WA Chapter from 1943)
 1896 – 1898		G. T. Poole
 1898 – 1900		M. F. Cavanagh
 1900 – 1902		G. T. Poole
 1903 – 1904		M.F. Cavanagh
 1905 – 1906		G. T. Poole
 1907 – 1908		P. W. Harrison
 1909 – 1910		J. T. Hobbs
 1911 – 1912		J. T. Hobbs
 1913 – 1914		G. T. Poole
 1915 – 1916		M. F. Cavanagh
 1917 – 1918		J. H. Eales
 1919 – 1921		A. R. L. Wright
 1922 – 1923		J. L. Ochiltree
 1923 – 1924 		A. R. L. Wright
 1924 – 1925		E. G. Cohen
 1926 – 1927		A. R. L. Wright	
 1928 – 1929		J. F. Allen
 1930 – 1931		E. LeB. Henderson
 1931 – 1933		J. F. Allen
 1933 – 1934		W. J. W. Forbes
 1935 – 1936		A. D. Cameron
 1937 – 1938		R. Summerhayes
 1938 – 1940		K. C. Duncan
 1940 – 1941		G. H. Parry
 1942 – 1945		A. E. Clare
 1945 – 1946		A. B. Winning
 1947 – 1948		W. A. Mcl. Green
 1949 – 1950		J. B. Fitzhardinge
 1951 – 1952		W. T. Leighton
 1953 – 1954		O. V. Chisholm
 1955 – 1956		K. C. Duncan
 1957 – 1958		M. W. G. Clifton
 1959 – 1960		D. O. Sands
 1961 – 1962		M. H. Parry
 1963 – 1964		W. T. Leighton
 1965 – 1966		G. W. Finn
 1967 – 1968		G. E. Summerhayes
 1969 – 1970		R. M. Fairbrother
 1971 – 1972		E. G. Cohen
 1973 – 1974		J. K. Duncan
 1975 – 1976		P. J. Grigg
 1977 – 1978		A. C. De Leo
 1979 – 1980		J. A. Pickering
 1981 – 1982		R. B. Bodycoat
 1983 – 1984		L. W. Hegvold
 1985 – 1986		M. Hardman
 1987 – 1988		J. Taylor
 1989 – 1990		B. F. C. Wright
 1991 – 1992		P. S. Parkinson
 1993 – 1994		G. F. H. Howlett
 1995 – 1996		G. L. London
 1997 – 1998		N. W. Shaw
 1999 – 2000		H. G. Schubert
 2001 - 2004		W. M. Kerr
 2004 – 2005		P Pinder
 2005 – 2007		I. Dewar
 2007 – 2011		R. Mollett
 2011 – 2014		D. Karotkin
 2014 - 2017		P. Griffith
 2017 - 2019		S. Hunt
 2019 - 2021		P. Hobbs
 2022 - 			S. Anghie

References

External links
 Australian Institute of Architects Website

Architecture organisations based in Australia
Commonwealth Association of Architects
Professional associations based in Australia
Organizations established in 1929
1929 establishments in Australia
Organisations based in Australia with royal patronage
Architecture-related professional associations